The Bratslav uezd was one of the uezds (uyezds or subdivisions) of the Podolian Governorate of the Russian Empire. It was situated in the central part of the governorate. Its administrative centre was Bratslav.

Demographics
At the time of the Russian Empire Census of 1897, Bratslavsky Uyezd had a population of 241,868. Of these, 82.6% spoke Ukrainian, 11.6% Yiddish, 3.3% Russian, 2.0% Polish, 0.1% Moldovan or Romanian, 0.1% German and 0.1% Tatar as their native language.

References

 
Uezds of Podolia Governorate